Bobby Wayne Woods (October 11, 1965 – December 3, 2009) was an American convicted murderer, kidnapper and rapist executed by the state of Texas for the murder and rape of 11-year-old Sarah Patterson in 1997. Woods also received a 40-year sentence for the abduction of Patterson's younger brother, whom he beat unconscious and left for dead but who survived. On May 28, 1998, Woods was sentenced to death for Patterson's murder and was executed on December 3, 2009, after a failed appeal based on Woods's low IQ.

Biography
A seventh-grade dropout, Woods was so illiterate that he had to refer to a spelling list just to write simple notes to his family. He had IQ scores of 70 and 68 during elementary school. His IQ score right before his murder trial was 70, and another in 2002 returned 68. Woods also worked as a short-order cook and roofer.

On April 30, 1997, Woods entered the home of his ex-girlfriend Schwana Patterson through the open window of her children's bedroom; Patterson had expelled Woods two months earlier. Woods then kidnapped Patterson's two children, 11-year-old Sarah Patterson and 9-year-old Cody Patterson, and raped Sarah. After driving to a cemetery, Woods beat and stomped Cody's head, strangled Cody, and abandoned the boy at the cemetery. Cody notified police, and Woods told police that Sarah was dead and led the police to her body.

Trial
Because the Woods case was heavily reported in Dallas-area media, Woods's trial was held in Llano, Texas. During his trial Woods admitted to kidnapping Patterson's children and beating Cody Patterson unconscious. A psychologist representing the defense but who did not evaluate Woods testified that Woods was mentally retarded and no longer a threat to society. In response, a psychiatrist representing prosecution testified that Woods was not mentally retarded and could commit future violent crimes. Woods, a resident of Granbury, Texas, was sentenced to death on May 28, 1998.

Patterson was also tried on charges of child neglect and was found guilty on October 14, 1998. She was sentenced to 23 years in prison.

Execution 
Woods was scheduled to be executed at 6 p.m. on October 23, 2008. However, the Texas Court of Criminal Appeals delayed the execution after lawyers raised issue that Woods's IQ would make him ineligible for the death penalty due to the United States Supreme Court case Atkins v. Virginia. That court ruled 8–1 on October 7, 2009, that there was insufficient evidence that Woods was retarded. The Supreme Court of the United States denied Woods's appeal hours before Woods's final execution day.

Woods was executed at 6:48 p.m. local time on December 3, 2009, in the Huntsville Unit state prison. He was the 50th murderer executed in the U.S. in 2009 and 1,186th since the U.S. Supreme Court ruled capital punishment constitutional in the 1976 case Gregg v. Georgia. In Texas, Woods was the 24th murderer executed in 2009 and 447th executed since 1976.

He is buried at Captain Joe Byrd Cemetery.

See also
 Capital punishment in Texas
 Capital punishment in the United States
 List of people executed in Texas, 2000–2009
 List of people executed in the United States in 2009

References

1965 births
2009 deaths
21st-century executions by Texas
American kidnappers
American murderers of children
American people convicted of murder
American rapists
People convicted of murder by Texas
21st-century executions of American people
People executed by Texas by lethal injection
People executed for murder
People with intellectual disability
People from Livingston, Texas